South Carolina Highway 300 (SC 300) is an  state highway in the U.S. state of South Carolina. The highway connects Ulmer with the Barnwell area.

Route description
SC 300 begins at US 278 south of Barnwell and heads in a southeasterly direction, crossing over Hurricane Creek and Parker Branch. It runs parallel with Caddins Branch through a small subdivision before it crosses over Wells Branch, leaving Barnwell County. It becomes Wells Branch Road as it enters Allendale County before passing by Dry Branch Hunting Reserve before it enters the Ulmer city limits. The highway then meets its southern terminus at US 301 (Burton's Ferry Highway) west of Ulmer.

Major intersections

See also

References

External links

SC 300 at Virginia Highways' South Carolina Highways Annex

300
Transportation in Allendale County, South Carolina
Transportation in Barnwell County, South Carolina